Chirru is a 2010 Kannada romantic action film directed by Mahesh Babu and written by Swamiji. The film stars Chiranjeevi Sarja and Kriti Kharbanda in leading roles whilst Kiran Srinivas plays a brief supporting role. The film released across Karnataka cinemas on 19 November 2010 to average and mixed response.

Plot
Chiru is an unemployed guy, who arrives in Bangalore for a job interview. One day, he falls in love with Madhu, the daughter of state's Home Minister Rajasekhar, but later learns that she is in love with Dilip, an IAS aspirant. Dilip and Madhu decide to elope, where Chiru also helps them. Rajasekhar mistakes Chiru to be Madhu's boyfriend and dispatches goons to kill him. However, Chiru clears the misunderstanding and Rajasekhar accepts Dilip and Madhu's marriage, and Chiru brings them back to Rajasekhar. Later, Chiru realizes that he misses Madhu, and decide to leave for his hometown. Madhu also realizes her love for Chiru, and reveals it to her mother. She ask Madhu to elope with Chiru, but Madhu refuses as she has already made her father feel ashamed and will not repeat the same mistake again. Rajasekhar overhears their conversation, and has a change of heart, where he reunites Chiru and Madhu.

Cast 
 Chiranjeevi Sarja as Chiru
 Kriti Kharbanda as Madhu
 Kiran Srinivas as Dilip
MG Srinivas as Srini
 Rangayana Raghu as Rajasekhar, Madhu's father
 Bullet Prakash
 Padma Vasanthi 
 P. N. Sathya 
Cool Chinna 
Umesh Punga 
Mahesh Babu
Kuruba Gowda

Soundtrack 
The music was composed by Giridhar Diwan for Jhankar music company.

Reception

Critical response 

A critic from The Times of India scored the film at 3.5 out of 5 stars and says "Chiranjivi steals the show with some good dance moves. Krithi Kharabanda excels in her performance, while Kiran's acts are impressive. Rangayana Raghu fits perfectly into his role. Sundaranath Suvarna's cinematography enhances the cinematic appeal". Shruti Indira Lakshminarayana of Rediff.com scored the film at 1.5 out of 5 stars and says "Kirti has bagged a role that doesn't confine her to songs alone. The debutant has enough scope for performance. Rangayana Raghu breaks free from his comic acts in this film and plays a concerned father. He carries off  the role with ease. Kiran Sreenivas has a meaty role too. Watch Chiru if you have nothing else planned for the weekend". A critic from Bangalore Mirror wrote  "Kriti is a good find and charms her way throughout and Kiran does not mind playing second fiddle.The lack of a sterling performance by Chiranjeevi and chartbuster songs are the drawbacks of this film. That does not mean it is not a good watch.  B S Srivani from Deccan Herald wrote "Chiranjeevi and Kiran make interesting contrasts just like Kriti with Rangayana Raghu – the actors getting the nuances just right. This Chirru makes all the right noises. Worth watching". A critic from The New Indian Express wrote "The major disadvantage of this film is lack of comedy which would have given the much needed break from the monotonous verbose narration. Bullet Prakash tries his best to make the audience giggle but fails".

References

External links 

 

2010 films
2010s Kannada-language films
Indian romantic action films
2010s romantic action films
Films directed by Mahesh Babu (director)